Sherwin Ting Gatchalian (born April 6, 1974), known as Win Gatchalian, is a Filipino politician and businessman serving as a Senator since 2016. A member of the Nationalist People's Coalition (NPC), he previously served as the Representative of Valenzuela's 1st district from 2001 to 2004 and from 2013 to 2016. He was the Mayor of Valenzuela from 2004 to 2013.

In 2001, Gatchalian was elected to the House of Representatives. After one term in Congress, he was elected mayor of Valenzuela. During his term as mayor, Gatchalian ended the city's garbage woes and oversaw the clearing operations in the aftermath of Typhoon Ondoy. He also implemented a number of education programs, the establishment of the Valenzuela City School of Mathematics and Science, and the accessibility to tertiary public educational institutions in the city, among others.

After serving as mayor of Valenzuela for three terms, Gatchalian ran again and was elected as 1st district Representative of Valenzuela in 2013. His return to the lower house saw Gatchalian try to implement some of Valenzuela's education reform initiatives with the filing of House Bill No. 5905, or the Free Higher Education Act.

Gatchalian then ran for and won a position in the Senate during the 2016 elections with his campaign around the promise of passing the Free Higher Education Act. In early 2017, the Senate passed the Free Higher Education Act, which Gatchalian co-authored and co-sponsored. President Rodrigo Duterte signed the measure into law as the Universal Access to Quality Tertiary Education Act (Republic Act No. 10931) in August 2017.

In addition to being chairman of the Senate Committees on Energy and Economic Affairs, he also authored a number of key measures that have been passed into law, including the Murang Kuryente Act, Electric Cooperatives Emergency and Resiliency Fund Act, the Energy Virtual One Stop Shop Act the Energy Efficiency and Conservation Act, and the Mobile Number Portability Act.

In 2022, Gatchalian ran for re-election and was elected to the Senate for his second term, placing fourth in the polls.

Early life and education
Gatchalian was born to industrialist William Gatchalian and Dee Hua Ting. He is the eldest of four siblings, including namely Kenneth, Rex, and Wes Gatchalian. The Gatchalian family identifies as evangelical Christian, with Dee Hua being a pastor and chairman at their own church, Jesus our Life Ministries in Barangay Maysan, Valenzuela.

Gatchalian finished his elementary and secondary education at Grace Christian High School in 1980s in Quezon City and graduated with a degree in Finance and Operations Management from Boston University in 1995.

Political career
Gatchalian has been a member of the political party Nationalist People's Coalition (NPC) since joining politics in 2001. He is the first generation of politicians from his family, alongside his sibling Rex Gatchalian, who is currently serving as Secretary of Social Welfare and Development and Wes Gatchalian who is the mayor of Valenzuela.

Mayor, Valenzuela (2004–2013)
During his nine-year tenure as local chief executive, Gatchalian revolutionized good governance in the City Government of Valenzuela through reforms which eradicated corruption, fostered growth in the local business sector, and improved the provision of social services in education, health, in-city housing, and other key areas. Gatchalian acknowledged that his style of governance as mayor is based on the practices employed by the Marikina government, which he once observed for two weeks.

Gatchalian developed city infrastructure operations for both citizens and enterprises. In 2008, he opened the government-funded P90-million Lingunan-Lawang Bato.

He formulated the "WIN ang Edukasyon Program" (Education Wins Program). Gatchalian initiated various education programs, such as public schools including the Valenzuela City School of Mathematics and Science, accessibility to college education particularly in the Pamantasan ng Lungsod ng Valenzuela and Valenzuela City Polytechnic College, school-based "K to 6 In-School Feeding Program" that mobilized communities; empowerment of parents through the Nanay-Teacher Program, and continuous mastery of skills to strengthen competencies of teachers.

Representative of the 1st District of Valenzuela (2013–2016) 
When Gatchalian returned to the Lower House in 2013, he filed education reforms to increase the number of math and science high schools across the country and to establish a nationwide school-based feeding program for kinder and elementary students across the country. On July 6, 2015, he filed the original version of the bill that revolutionized access to college education for millions of Filipino—the House Bill No. 5905, An Act Providing for Full Tuition Subsidy in State Universities and Colleges (SUCs), more commonly known as the Free Higher Education Act, that translated into the current law Republic Act No. 10931 or the Universal Access to Quality Tertiary Education Act. He also supports the implementation of K–12 education in the Philippines as an investment for the future of younger generations.

Some of his other proposed bills during this term include acts regulating parking fees in malls and commercial areas, including ROTC among the prerequisites for tertiary level graduation, increasing the budget for NAIA to transform its global image, abolishing the Road Board (a government agency that handled motor vehicle users' tax and road users' tax), protecting passengers against abusive and itinerant taxi drivers, for the declaration of candidates seeking to profit from election polls as nuisance candidates, as well as a proposed bill requiring proofs of parking space to car purchasers as a means to lessen traffic congestion.

Other priority bills authored include:
 House Bill No. (HBN) 5905 Free Higher Education Act
 HBN-5348 Nutri-Skwela Act
 HBN-5098 Proof of Parking Space Act
 HBN-4714 Servando Act
 HBN-4284 CCTV Cameras for Crime Prevention Act
 HBN-4740 Internet Café Regulation Act
 HBN-2338 Mandatory ROTC Act
 HBN-2624 SIM Card Registration Act
 HBN-3681 Bill of Rights of Taxi Passengers

Senator (as of 2016) 
In June 2015, in an event in Quezon province, Gatchalian announced his bid for a Senate seat in the 2016 general election. In October 2015, senator and presidential candidate Grace Poe announced her senatorial slate under the coalition Partido Galing at Puso which included Gatchalian. Gatchalian eventually won, receiving 14,953,768 votes and placing 10th in the senatorial race. He challenged then-incoming President Rodrigo Duterte to make education reform a top priority of his administration.

In the 17th Congress, Gatchalian served as chairman of the Committee on Energy and Committee on Economic Affairs. In the 18th Congress, he served again as the chairman of the energy committee and also of the Committee on Basic Education, Arts and Culture.

Some of the significant laws Gatchalian passed include the Universal Access to Quality Tertiary Education Act, the Tax Reform for Acceleration and Inclusion Law, the Free Irrigation Service Act, the Masustansyang Pagkain para sa Batang Pilipino Act, the Electric Cooperatives Emergency and Resiliency Fund Act, the Anti-Hazing Act of 2018, the Philippine Identification System Act, the Mobile Number Portability Act, the Energy Virtual One-Stop Shop Act, the Energy Efficiency and Conservation Act, the Rice Trade Liberalization Act, the Philippine Innovation Act, the Student Fare Discount Act, and the Murang Kuryente Act.

In October 2021, he filed a certificate to continue his term as a Senator. Campaigning for education reform, he won his re-election bid and placed fourth in the polls. He is now serving as Senator of the 19th Congress.  His priority bills include the Teacher Salary Increase Act, Academic Recovery and Accessible Learning (ARAL) Program Act, K to 12 Review, 21st Century School Boards Act, Waste-to-Energy Act, Midstream Natural Gas Industry Development Act, Energy Advocate Act, Energy Transition Act, SIM Card Registration Act and the Internet Transactions Act.

Awards and recognition 

 Personal awards 

 For Valenzuela 
Number 1 in NCR, National Achievement Test (NAT) for Elementary (S.Y. 2010–2011)

References

External links 

 

1974 births
Living people
People from Valenzuela, Metro Manila
Nationalist People's Coalition politicians
Senators of the 17th Congress of the Philippines
Senators of the 18th Congress of the Philippines
Members of the House of Representatives of the Philippines from Valenzuela, Metro Manila
Mayors of Valenzuela, Metro Manila
Senators of the 19th Congress of the Philippines